João Victor da Silva Oliveira (born 6 April 2002), commonly known as João Victor, is a Brazilian footballer who currently plays as a left back for Athletico Paranaense.

Career statistics

Club

References

External links
Athletico Paranaense profile 

2002 births
Living people
Sportspeople from Campinas
Brazilian footballers
Association football defenders
Campeonato Brasileiro Série A players
Club Athletico Paranaense players